Simon Kayserling was a German educator and writer; born at Hanover 31 August 1834; died there 22 April 1898; brother of Meyer Kayserling. He attended the Talmud school in Würzburg and the University of Berlin. He was the principal teacher and inspector of the M. M. David'sche Freischule from 1861, and taught for several years in the Jewish teachers' seminary in Hanover.

Kayserling translated into German from a French version, which had been corrected by Lelewel, J. J. Benjamin's Yewen Mezulah (Hanover, 1863), an account of the Polish-Cossack war and of the sufferings of the Jews in Poland during the period 1648-53; also F. D. Mocatta's The Jews of Spain and Portugal and the Inquisition (ib. 1878).

References 

19th-century German writers
19th-century German male writers
Heads of schools in Germany
19th-century German Jews
Writers from Hanover
1834 births
1898 deaths